Philipp Schoch (born 10 October 1979) is a Swiss snowboarder. He won a gold medal in the Parallel Giant Slalom at the 2002 Winter Olympics. At the next Olympics, he faced his brother Simon Schoch in the Parallel Giant Slalom Final. Philipp raced away to an unassailable 0.88 second lead in the first leg of the final, retaining his Olympic crown. He is the first snowboarder to win two gold medals in the Winter Olympics. At the world championships, he won two silver medals in the slalom events in 2007.

References

External links
 SchochBrothers.ch – Website of Philipp and Simon Schoch

Swiss male snowboarders
Olympic snowboarders of Switzerland
Snowboarders at the 2002 Winter Olympics
Snowboarders at the 2006 Winter Olympics
Snowboarders at the 2014 Winter Olympics
1979 births
Living people
Olympic gold medalists for Switzerland
Olympic medalists in snowboarding
Medalists at the 2006 Winter Olympics
Medalists at the 2002 Winter Olympics
People from Winterthur
Sportspeople from the canton of Zürich
21st-century Swiss people